The 1990 IPSC Handgun World Shoot IV held in Adelaide, Australia was the 9th IPSC Handgun World Shoot, and was won by Doug Koenig of USA, the first competitor using a red dot sight at a World Shoot. Having been interested in shooting since being eleven years old, Koenig had been spotted at a local shooting club for his good natural abilities with a handgun.

Champions
Individual

Teams

See also 
IPSC Rifle World Shoots
IPSC Shotgun World Shoot
IPSC Action Air World Shoot

References

Match Results - 1990 Handgun World Shoot, Australia

1990
1990 in shooting sports
Shooting competitions in Australia
1990 in Australian sport
International sports competitions hosted by Australia
Sports competitions in Adelaide
1990s in Adelaide